In economic theory, the money pump argument is a thought experiment showing that rational behavior requires transitive preferences. Classical economic theory assumes that preferences are transitive: if someone thinks A is better than B and B is better than C, then they must think A is better than C. In other words, there cannot be a "cycle" of preferences.

The money pump argument notes that if someone held a set of intransitive preferences, they could be exploited (pumped) for money until being forced to leave the market. Imagine Jane has twenty dollars to buy fruit. She can fill her basket with either oranges or apples. Jane would prefer to have a dollar rather than an apple, an apple rather than an orange, and an orange rather than a dollar. Because Jane would rather have an orange than a dollar, she is willing to buy an orange for just over a dollar (perhaps $1.10). Then, she trades her orange for an apple, because she would rather have an apple rather than an orange. Finally, she sells her apple for a dollar, because she would rather have a dollar than an apple. At this point, Jane is left with $19.90, and has lost 10¢ and gained nothing in return. This process can be repeated until Jane is left with no money. (Note that, if Jane truly holds these preferences, she would see nothing wrong with this process, and would not try to stop this process; at every step, Jane agrees she has been left better off.) After running out of money, Jane leaves the market, and her preferences and actions cease to be economically relevant.

Experiments in behavioral economics show that subjects can violate the requirement for transitive preferences when comparing bets. However, most subjects do not make these choices in within-subject comparisons where the contradiction would be obviously visible (in other words, the subjects do not hold genuinely intransitive preferences, but instead make mistakes when making choices using heuristics).

See also

 Dutch book

References

Applied probability
Microeconomics
Wagering
Thought experiments